La Prisonnière (also known as Woman in Chains) is a French film written and directed by Henri-Georges Clouzot that was released in 1968. It is about an attractive young woman living with an avant-garde artist who falls disastrously for the voyeuristic owner of the gallery which shows her husband's work. Clouzot's only film completed in colour, it was the last of his career.

Plot
Stanislas, a wealthy unmarried owner of an art gallery in Paris, is friend and patron to Gilbert, a creator of progressive artworks, who lives in a little suburban flat with José, a television editor. At the opening night of an exhibition, Gilbert goes off with an attractive young woman who is an influential critic.

Left alone, José goes back with Stanislas to his luxurious flat, where he shows her a photograph he had taken of a naked woman in bondage. Though she is shocked and leaves, the allure of Stanislas and of his pornographic image works in her mind until one day she asks him if she can sit in on a photo session. Finding herself increasingly excited by the rising erotic tension of the shoot and by the sexiness of the pretty young model, José angers Stanislas by leaving in confusion. The two make it up, however, and José  starts posing for him, but she wants more than this artificial connection.

Gilbert, unhappy with her unexplained absences, goes on a business trip to Germany, and José and Stanislas travel together to an inn in Brittany. After a night together, Stanislas has second thoughts and abandons her there. Deeply hurt at this behaviour, José  tells all to Gilbert on his return. He rushes off to Stanislas' flat, intending to kill him, but the two reach a sort of reconciliation. Following in her own car, José shoots a level crossing and is hit by a train. Coming out of her coma in hospital, she thinks that Gilbert, waiting by the bedside, is Stanislas come to reclaim her.

Cast
Laurent Terzieff : Stanislas, art gallery owner
Bernard Fresson : Gilbert, avant-garde artist
Élisabeth Wiener : José, Gilbert's partner
Dany Carrel : Maguy, Stanislas' model
Michel Piccoli : guest at the gallery
Charles Vanel : guest at the gallery
Joanna Shimkus : guest at the gallery
Jackie Sardou : The cashier

Themes
The film is close in theme to some other pictures of the time. Both Michelangelo Antonioni's Blow Up and Michael Powell's Peeping Tom explored the dark links between men who make erotic images of women, films about such men and their models, and the viewers of such films, while Luis Buñuel's Belle de jour acted out the sadomasochistic fantasies of a beautiful middle-class woman. Contemporary also are its visual elements of pop and psychedelic art, including a striking dream sequence reminiscent of Stanley Kubrick's 2001: A Space Odyssey (similar use of these elements can be found in Clouzot's aborted earlier film L'Enfer).

Reception
Review sites surveyed on 17 February 2016 give ratings of 67% at SensCritique, 70% at Rotten Tomatoes, 71% at IMDb and 72% at Allociné.

References

External links
 
 La Prisonnière at Variety Distribution
 

1968 films
1960s French-language films
French drama films
BDSM in films
Films directed by Henri-Georges Clouzot
1968 drama films
Films with screenplays by Henri-Georges Clouzot
1960s French films